Indiana Bell Telephone Company, Incorporated, is the Bell Operating Company serving Indiana. It is an indirect subsidiary of AT&T Inc., owned by AT&T Teleholdings.

History
Indiana Bell was founded in 1920 to function as the central Bell telephone company in the state of Indiana. It purchased the Indiana operations of the Central Union Telephone Company and also purchased the Indianapolis Telephone Company. It continued to expand throughout the 1920s through acquisitions.

The move was an engineering feat of its time.

Throughout the 1940s and 1950s the company continued to expand by acquiring many smaller telephone companies throughout the state.

After the 1984 Bell System Divestiture, Indiana Bell became a part of Ameritech, one of the seven original Regional Bell Operating Companies.

In 1990, the independent board of directors of Indiana Bell was dissolved.

Presidents 
Edgar S. Bloom, 1920–1921

Curtis H. Rottger, 1921–1930

James F. Carroll, 1930–1946

William A. Hughes, 1946–1948

Harry S. Hanna, 1948–1960

Roy C. Echols, 1960–1968

Thomas S. Nurnberger, 1968–1970

David K. Easlick, 1970–1971

James E. Olson, 1972–1974

John W. Arbuckle, 1974–1976

Delbert C. "Bud" Staley, 1976–1978

William L. Weiss, 1978v1981

Philip A. Campbell, 1981–1982

William P. Vititoe, 1982–1983

Ramon L. Humke, 1983–1989

Richard C. Notebaert, 1989–1992

Thomas J. Reiman, 1992–1994

Kent A. Lebherz, 1994–2000

George S. Fleetwood, 2000–2013

William L. Soards II, 2013–

Corporate rebranding
The Indiana Bell name continued to be used until January 1993, when Ameritech dropped all individual Bell Operating Company names in favor of using the corporate name for marketing purposes, and Indiana Bell began doing business under the trade name Ameritech Indiana. In 2001, two years after Ameritech was acquired by SBC Communications, SBC rebranded all of its companies to include the SBC name, and Indiana Bell began doing business as SBC Ameritech Indiana. In 2002, SBC rebranded all of its companies simply as "SBC" for use as a national brand. Indiana Bell then started doing business as SBC Indiana. After AT&T Corporation was acquired by SBC Communications, SBC renamed itself AT&T, resulting in Indiana Bell taking the trade name AT&T Indiana.

References

External links

AT&T subsidiaries
Bell System
Telecommunications companies of the United States
Companies based in Indianapolis
Defunct telecommunications companies of the United States
Telecommunications companies established in 1920
American companies established in 1920